Reuland Castle is a castle in southeast Belgium, Burg-Reuland, near the border of Germany, probably built after 1148 by the von Reuland nobles.

The castle was sold in 1322 to Count John the Blind and the
King of Bohemia. On 24 May 1384 King Wenzel of Luxembourg designated Edmund von Engelsdorf the Secretary of the Treasury of Luxembourg, and donated the Castle and the Reuland Domain (comprising the villages Oberbesslang and Niederbesslang) to him.

See also
List of castles in Belgium

External links 

Burgruine in Burg Reuland (de)
Information on Castle of Brug Reuland, Tourist Office Wallonia and Brussels

Hill castles
Castles in the Ardennes (Belgium)
Castles in the Eifel
Castles in Belgium
Castles in Liège Province
Buildings and structures in the German-speaking Community of Belgium
Burg-Reuland